Massachusetts House of Representatives' 1st Plymouth district in the United States is one of 160 legislative districts included in the lower house of the Massachusetts General Court. It covers part of the city of Plymouth in Plymouth County. Republican Matt Muratore of Plymouth has represented the district since 2015.

The current district geographic boundary overlaps with that of the Massachusetts Senate's Plymouth and Barnstable district.

Representatives
 George M. Allen, circa 1858 
 John Burnham, circa 1859 
 Elkanah Finney, circa 1888 
 Alfred Burns, circa 1908
 Elmer Briggs, circa 1918
 Alfred P. Richards, circa 1920 
 John J. O'Brien, circa 1923
 Ira Ward, circa 1935
 John A. Armstrong, circa 1951 
 George Young, circa 1967
 Daniel J. Henderson, circa 1975 
 Caroline Stouffer, 1977-1978
 Alfred Almeida, circa 1980
 Peter Forman, 1981–1995
 Linda Teagan, 1995–1997
 Joseph Gallitano, 1997–1999
 Vinny deMacedo, 1999 – January 7, 2015
 Mathew J. Muratore, 2015-current

Former locales
The district previously covered:
 Cohasset, circa 1872 
 Scituate, circa 1872

See also
 List of Massachusetts House of Representatives elections
 Other Plymouth County districts of the Massachusetts House of Representatives: 2nd, 3rd, 4th, 5th, 6th, 7th, 8th, 9th, 10th, 11th, 12th
 List of Massachusetts General Courts
 List of former districts of the Massachusetts House of Representatives

Images
Portraits of legislators

References

External links
 Ballotpedia
  (State House district information based on U.S. Census Bureau's American Community Survey).
 League of Women Voters Plymouth Area

House
Government of Plymouth County, Massachusetts